Kim Jin-sol (born November 3, 1993) is a South Korean beauty pageant titleholder who was crowned Miss Korea 2016.

Personal life
Kim Jin-sol was born in Seoul, South Korea and majored in vocals at Sookmyung Women's University.

Miss Korea 2016
Kim Jin-sol was crowned Miss Korea 2016 during the Miss Korea 2016 competition held on July 8, 2016.

References

External links
 
 2016 Miss Korea profile

1993 births
Living people
Miss Korea winners
People from Seoul
Sookmyung Women's University alumni